The Mexican funnel-eared bat (Natalus stramineus) is a bat species native to the Caribbean.

Description
The Mexican funnel-eared bat has very distinct funnel shaped ears, hence its name. The ears tilt forward, and the face has a triangular shape and pale skin. Both sexes of this species are similar in size, unlike other species. They have brown fur, which becomes darker as it reaches the tip. They tend to live in deep and very humid caves and have groups from 100 up to 10,000 bats.

Distribution
The Mexican funnel-eared bat is endemic to the Lesser Antilles islands.

References

Further reading
 Ricardo López-Wilchis, Luis M. Guevara-Chumacero, Neófito ángeles Pérez, Javier Juste, Carlos IbáñEz, and Irene D. L. A. Barriga-Sosa. "Taxonomic status assessment of the Mexican populations of funnel-eared bats, genus Natalus (Chiroptera: Natalidae)", Acta Chiropterologica 14(2), pp. 305-316, January 1, 2012, .
 Adrian Tejedor, "A new species of funnel-eared Bat (Natalidae: Natalus) from Mexico", Journal of Mammalogy, Volume 86, Issue 6, 14 December 2005, pp. 1109–1120,  
 José Williams Torres-Flores and Ricardo López-Wilchis. "Trophic niche and diet of Natalus mexicanus (Chiroptera: Natalidae) in a tropical dry forest of western Mexico", Acta Chiropterologica 20(2), pp. 343–350, February 14, 2019, .

Bats of the Caribbean
Least concern biota of North America
Mammals described in 1838
Mammals of Anguilla
Mammals of Antigua and Barbuda
Mammals of Dominica
Mammals of Guadeloupe
Mammals of Martinique
Mammals of Montserrat
Mammals of Saint Kitts and Nevis
Natalus
Taxa named by John Edward Gray